The RP Funding Center (formerly the Lakeland Civic Center and the Lakeland Center) is a multipurpose entertainment complex in Lakeland, Florida, comprising a convention center, arena and theater. Currently, it is home to the Florida Tropics SC of the Major Arena Soccer League and the Lakeland Magic, the Orlando Magic's affiliate in the NBA G League.

About
It was home to the Lakeland Loggerheads of the World Hockey Association 2 during the 2003–04 season, the Lakeland Thunderbolts of the National Indoor Football League and later the American Indoor Football Association from 2005 until 2007, the Lakeland Raiders of the Ultimate Indoor Football League (later to be known as the Florida Marine Raiders of X-League Indoor Football) from 2012 until 2015, and the Central Florida Jaguars of the American Indoor Football in 2016. In 2018, the Florida Tarpons of the American Arena League relocated to Lakeland to use the arena for its home games.

The South Florida Bulls men's basketball team played many home games at the then Lakeland Civic Center throughout the 1970s, and during the 2011–12 season when the Sun Dome was being renovated.

The Tampa Bay Rowdies of the defunct North American Soccer League used the arena for indoor soccer on several occasions including three of their sixteen home games during the 1983-84 indoor season. This would also prove to be the league's final indoor campaign before suspending operations following the 1984 outdoor season.

In 1975 and 1976 the arena hosted National Hockey League exhibition matches between the Minnesota North Stars and the Atlanta Flames. Atlanta won both matches by the scores of 3–2 and 5–2, respectively. Beginning with their inaugural season (1992–93), the Tampa Bay Lightning used the center for training camp and exhibition games for several years. On September 23, 1992, hockey history was made as Manon Rhéaume became the first woman to play in an NHL exhibition game as the Tampa Bay Lightning played against the St. Louis Blues.

Elvis Presley played the Civic Center on April 27, 1975 (two shows, a matinee and an evening performance) and another evening performance on April 28, 1975. He played the center again a year later on September 4, 1976 (two performances, a matinee and an evening show).

The Grateful Dead performed at the arena on May 21, 1977. The show makes up half of the archival live album, Dick's Picks Volume 29.

Duran Duran played here on March 26, 1984 as part of their Sing Blue Silver world tour.

Bon Jovi performed two back-to-back, sold-out shows at the arena in September 1989 as part of their New Jersey Syndicate Tour. The shows were recorded and some tracks released as B-Sides.

Slayer performed here during the Clash of the Titans tour on July 13, 1991, headlining together with Megadeth and Anthrax, and supported by Alice in Chains. Slayer's set was recorded and released as part of a double live-album, entitled Decade of Aggression.

U2 started the Zoo TV Tour on February 29, 1992 with a sold out concert with a total of 7,400 people.

Kiss performed here in 1976 when guitarist Ace Frehley was electrocuted leading him to later go on and write his song "Shock Me", included on the Love Gun album.

Since 2019 it is the current home of the Central Florida Comic Con.

References

External links
Official website of RP Funding Center
The Concert Database

Basketball venues in Florida
Buildings and structures in Lakeland, Florida
Defunct indoor soccer venues in the United States
Florida Tropics SC
Indoor arenas in Florida
Indoor ice hockey venues in Florida
Indoor soccer venues in the United States
Lakeland Magic
Music venues in Florida
NBA G League venues
North American Soccer League (1968–1984) indoor venues
Tampa Bay Rowdies sports facilities
Sports venues in Lakeland, Florida
Sports venues completed in 1974
1974 establishments in Florida
Former South Florida Bulls sports venues